The Kilombero languages are a group of Bantu languages of Tanzania established in Nurse (1988).

The languages, along with their Guthrie identifications, are: 

Pogolo (G50)
Mbunga (P10), Ndamba (G50)

Notes